The 1954 All-Ireland Minor Hurling Championship was the 24th staging of the All-Ireland Minor Hurling Championship since its establishment by the Gaelic Athletic Association in 1928.

Tipperary entered the championship as the defending champions in search of a third successive title.

On 5 September 1954 Dublin won the championship following a 2-7 to 2-3 defeat of Tipperary in the All-Ireland final. This was their third All-Ireland title and their first in eight championship seasons.

Results

All-Ireland Minor Hurling Championship

Semi-finals

Final

External links
 All-Ireland Minor Hurling Championship: Roll Of Honour

Minor
All-Ireland Minor Hurling Championship